Hugo Miguel Pereira Cardoso (born 20 March 1983) simply known as Fininho is a Portuguese retired professional footballer who played as a winger.

External links 

1983 births
Living people
Association football midfielders
Portuguese footballers
Portuguese expatriate footballers
CF Rayo Majadahonda players
Atlético Malagueño players
Real Jaén footballers
F.C. Famalicão players
F.C. Vizela players
Gondomar S.C. players
A.D. Lousada players
AD Oliveirense players
G.D. Serzedelo players
Segunda División B players
Segunda División players
Liga Portugal 2 players
Footballers from Lisbon
Portuguese expatriate sportspeople in Spain
Expatriate footballers in Spain